This article lists census-designated places (CDPs) in the U.S. state of Wisconsin. As of 2018, there were a total of 176 census-designated places in Wisconsin, down from 179 in the 2010 Census. Lake Shangrila and Pell Lake were annexed by Bristol and Bloomfield in 2011, respectively. Windsor incorporated in 2015.

Census-Designated Places

References

See also
List of cities in Wisconsin
List of counties in Wisconsin
List of municipalities in Wisconsin by population
List of towns in Wisconsin
List of villages in Wisconsin

 
Census-designated places
Wisconsin